Truth & Iliza is an American late-night talk and news satire program that aired on Freeform. It premiered on May 2, 2017, and is hosted by comedian Iliza Shlesinger. The title is derived from her podcast of the same name which ran from 2014 to 2016.

Episodes

References

External links
 Website
 Podcast

2017 American television series debuts
2017 American television series endings
2010s American late-night television series
2010s American satirical television series
2010s American television news shows
American news parodies
English-language television shows
Freeform (TV channel) original programming
Television series by Disney–ABC Domestic Television